Destiny of Souls is a book by Dr. Michael Newton (9 December 1931 – 22 September 2016), published in 2000. Newton was a hypnotherapist who developed his own age regression technique. The Michael Newton Institute for Life Between Lives Hypnotherapy is a ‘non-profit’ organization formed in 2002. The Institute was set up to train qualified hypnotherapists to continue Dr Newton's work on past lives and spiritual realms.

Summary 

In his second book, and through what he calls research into the afterlife, Michael Newton claims to have documented the results of his clinical work in spiritual hypnotherapy. These are presented in a form of case studies and Newton asserts that they uncover the hidden aspects of the spirit world.

Reception 

Publishers Weekly in their review said that this book was "a rich volume, chock-full of interviews and fascinating first-person narratives, this book is nonetheless not for the uninitiated; Newton sometimes fails to explain his terminology, so readers who do not know much about "lives between lives" may feel lost. More informed readers, however, will find this a feast, and Newton a charming host." Destiny of Souls won the Independent Publisher Book Award in 2001 in the New Age category, one of 49 categories of this annual award.

Notes and references

External links 
Biography on Newton's website

2000 non-fiction books
New Age books
Books about the paranormal
Books about reincarnation